The World Masters is one of the longest-running and most prestigious of the BDO/WDF tournaments, which began in 1974. The tournament is sponsored by darts board manufacturer, Winmau. The World Masters was unusual in darts in that its sets are the best of 3 legs (first to 2) rather than the standard best of 5 legs (first to 3).

It was previously the final leg of the BDO's Grand Slam title of televised majors, along with the BDO World Darts Championship, International Darts League and World Darts Trophy, until the latter two tournaments were axed in 2008. The champion is referred to as the World Master.

The tournament was unseeded for most of its history and all players entered the main draw in the first round. Seedings were introduced for the first time in 2007 at the behest of the BBC to ensure the top players were present for the televised stages of the event. Thus, the top eight ranked players received a bye to the last-16.

After the collapse of the British Darts Organisation in September 2020, the World Darts Federation announced plans to launch the WDF World Masters. In December 2020, it was announced that the 2021 tournament will be held at De Bonte Wever in Assen, Netherlands. This was then pushed back to 2022 due to ongoing coronavirus restrictions. The new WDF version of the event changed the format from setplay to legplay for the first time, with significantly shorter matches.

List of tournament finals

Men's World Masters

Women's World Masters

World Youth Masters

Boys' World Masters

Girls' World Masters

Records
Most men's tournament wins 5 - Eric Bristow. 

Bob Anderson and Martin Adams have both won 3 times (also both achieving 'hat tricks' by winning in three consecutive years), while Dave Whitcombe, John Lowe, Raymond van Barneveld, Stephen Bunting and Glen Durrant have all won the Masters twice.

Youngest champion Michael van Gerwen (2006) aged 17 years, 174 days, who eclipsed the record of Eric Bristow

Double Champion Leeanne Maddock (1992) aged 17 years won both the youth title and the women's title.

Joint World Championship & Masters Champions Only seven players have ever won the World Masters and the World Championship in the same season. Eric Bristow achieved the feat three times (1979 Masters 1980 World, 1983–84 and 1984–85). Bob Anderson (1987–88), Richie Burnett (1994–95), John Walton (2000–01), Martin Adams (2009–10 and 2010–11), Stephen Bunting (2013–14) and Glen Durrant (2016–17) were the others. There have been two other instances of players holding both championships at the same time (Phil Taylor 1990 and Raymond van Barneveld 2005) - but these were not during the same season which is considered to end with the World Championship.

Not Dropping A Set Stephen Bunting's 2013 win was achieved without dropping a set.

There are 15 players who have won the Masters and the BDO World Championship during their careers: John Lowe, Eric Bristow, Bob Anderson, Phil Taylor, Dennis Priestley, Richie Burnett, Steve Beaton, Raymond van Barneveld, Les Wallace, John Walton, Andy Fordham, Martin Adams, Scott Waites, Stephen Bunting, and Glen Durrant. Additionally, Michael van Gerwen won the Masters in 2006 and has since won the PDC World Championship three times, but not the BDO World Championship.

Media coverage

1974–1988 ITV
1989 Not broadcast
1990 The Sports Channel (part of the short-lived satellite TV service BSB)
1991–1992 Sky Sports
1993–1994 Wire TV
1995      L!VE TV (highlights on the ITV night time programme 'Sport AM' as well as on the HTV Wales programme 'Top Sport')
1996–2000 Eurosport
2001–2010 BBC
2011–2012 ESPN
2013–2015 Eurosport
2016      Premier Sports
2017      Eurosport
2018      No TV Broadcaster (streamed on YouTube and Winmau TV)
2019      Eurosport
2022      No TV Broadcaster (streamed on YouTube)
The 2011 tournament was also shown in the United States for the first time with ESPN3 broadcasting it.

References

External links
 World Darts Federation Official Homepage

 
1974 establishments in England
British Darts Organisation tournaments